Raving Rabbids: Alive & Kicking known as simply Rabbids: Alive & Kicking, and as Rabbids: Fuori di schermo in Italy, is a party video game developed by Ubisoft Paris and Ubisoft Milan and published on November 3, 2011 in Australia, November 4, 2011 in Europe and November 8, 2011 in North America for the Xbox 360. This is the sixth game from the Raving Rabbids games franchise and it is the first Rabbids game not released on the Nintendo Wii. The game was exclusively developed for the Kinect and consists of mini-games with up to 4 players.

Premise 
The game follows the Rabbids planning to rule the surface by trying to increase their population. The leader wants the scientist rabbid to use a Cow for their experiment on breeding more Rabbids. Once it worked, the invasion begins and the player must complete many minigames to contain the rabbids before it's too late.

Reception 

Rabbids: Alive & Kicking received "mixed" reviews according to the review aggregation website Metacritic. Mitch Dyer of IGN criticized the game for the gameplay but not for the controllers: "Imprecise controls ruin the uncomplicated games. It started out unfulfilling and didn't get much better. It's the kind of mindless thing I'd load up on my phone for five minute bursts." However, GameSpot criticized the "weak visuals" and "tedious navigation."

Common Sense Media gave the game three stars out of five, saying, "Rabbids: Alive & Kicking isn't as good as it could have been. The games are often fun and inventive -- we particularly liked one that involved moving to different areas of our play space and calling out for a blind rabbid to walk towards us, luring him into stepping on tacks, slipping on an oil slack, and walking into a live wire -- but there are a few that are just plain confusing and left us scratching our heads." Digital Spy gave it a similar score of three stars out of five, saying that it "Features more highlights than low points, which makes it a worthy mini-game compilation for those looking to party with Kinect." However, Metro gave it a score of two out of ten, saying, "Thank goodness Rayman is back because his would-be usurpers have never seemed more inanely un-entertaining than in this vapid mini-game collection."

Notes

References

External links 
 

2011 video games
Kinect games
Multiplayer and single-player video games
Party video games
Rabbids
Ubisoft games
Video games about rabbits and hares
Video games developed in France
Video games developed in Italy
Xbox 360 games
Xbox 360-only games